Coast Guard Air Station Sacramento is an Air Station of the United States Coast Guard, located in Sacramento County, California.  The station has 189 personnel assigned and operates 6 Alenia C-27J Spartan aircraft on medium-range patrol and search-and-rescue missions.  It is located at McClellan Airfield, formerly McClellan Air Force Base, where it is the only remaining military tenant.

External links 
 Air Station Sacramento official web page

References 

United States Coast Guard Air Stations